NYC Urban Search & Rescue Task Force or also known by its Federal Emergency Management Agency (FEMA) designation of NY-TF1 is a FEMA Urban Search and Rescue Task Force based in New York City, New York. NY-TF1 is managed by the NYC Emergency Management (NYCEM) and its members mainly come from Fire Department of New York and the New York City Police Department.

After the 2010 Haiti earthquake the team deployed to Haiti and rescued a pair of siblings from a collapsed building on January 21, 2010.  This was their 5th rescue of the activation.

References

External links
  - Official homepage of NY-TF1
  - NYC Emergency Management US&R

New York 1
Government of New York City
Rescue
New York City Emergency Management